Lucas Lionel Dias (born 22 May 1999) is a French professional footballer who plays as goalkeeper for Ligue 2 club Nîmes.

Career
Dias made his professional debut for Nîmes at the age of 17 in a 2–0 loss to AJ Auxerre on 29 November 2016. On 18 June 2019, Dias signed his first professional contract with Nîmes.

Personal life
Born in France, Dias is of Portuguese descent through his paternal grandfather from Porto.

References

External links
 
 
 Dias Nîmes Profile

1999 births
Living people
Footballers from Lyon
Association football goalkeepers
French footballers
French people of Portuguese descent
Nîmes Olympique players
Ligue 1 players
Ligue 2 players
Championnat National 2 players
Championnat National 3 players